Intijahuana (possibly from Quechua inti sun, qhawana, viewpoint; window, "sun viewpoint") is a  mountain in the Vilcanota mountain range in the Andes of Peru. It is located in the Cusco Region, Canchis Province, on the border of the districts of Checacupe and Pitumarca. Intijahuana lies north of Huarisallana.

References

Mountains of Peru
Mountains of Cusco Region